J.C. Flowers & Co. is an American private equity investment firm, focused on investments in the financial services sector. The firm, founded in 2001, is based in New York City and run by billionaire J. Christopher Flowers, a former Goldman Sachs partner. As of 2017, the firm had invested more than $15 billion in capital.

JC Flowers manages two private equity funds, J.C. Flowers I LP, closed in 2002 with $900 million of committed capital, and J.C. Flowers II LP, closed in 2006 with $7.0 billion of committed capital.  Both funds are focused exclusively on the financial services sector.  JC Flowers in Europe is led by its managing director, David Morgan.

Investments 
JC Flowers' most notable investments include such financial services companies as:
 Chi-X Australia along with Chi-X Japan and Chi-Tech Hong Kong
 Enstar Group
 Shinsei Bank
 NIBC Bank N.V.
 Hypo Real Estate Group (Germany) (formerly 24.9%)
 First Bank (Romania) (76.1%)
 HSH Nordbank (Germany) (26.6%)
 Fox-Pitt Kelton Cochran Caronia Waller
 Equita Sim (Italy) (50,01%)
 Eurovita (Italy) (78,19%)
 MF Global (US) (6.8%)
 One Savings Bank (UK) - Specialist Mortgage Lender

Other notable activity
JC Flowers has also been active in a number of high-profile contemplated transactions that did not occur. In mid-2007, an investor group led by JC Flowers signed an agreement to purchase Sallie Mae for approximately $25 billion (USD), giving JC Flowers and Friedman Fleischer & Lowe 50.2 percent of the company. This deal fell through, however. In late 2007, JC Flowers was one of the many companies bidding for the troubled British Bank, Northern Rock. They pulled out of the bidding in December.

On January 21, 2008, JC Flowers made an informal bid of £4bn for Friends Provident. A revised bid of £3.5 billion was rejected.  On March 14, 2008, JC Flowers was reported to be in talks to buy troubled US investment bank Bear Stearns.  On April 16, 2008, JC Flowers issued an offer to buy 24.9% of the shares of Hypo Real Estate Group at a price of €22.50 per share.  At the end of 2006, JC Flowers purchased a company called PanEuroLife in Luxembourg and started to build the NewPELGroup.

In July 2010 JC Flowers announced its intention to purchase a stake in the UK's Kent Reliance Building Society and this deal was completed on 1 February 2011 with the formation of OneSavings Bank Plc.

In December 2012 JC Flowers was reported to have submitted a non-binding first-round bid for the 316 branches being re-auctioned by The Royal Bank of Scotland Group. In July 2013, JC Flowers agreed to buy £450 million of loans belonging to struggling British bank Northern Rock.

In October 2016, JC Flowers aided the acquisition of retail stockbroker TD Direct Investing Europe by a smaller rival Interactive Investor to create the United Kingdom's second-biggest online fund supermarket.

In May 2017, JC Flowers completed the acquisition of the insurance company UK General for an undisclosed sum.

References

External links

 

Private equity firms of the United States
Financial services companies established in 2001
Privately held companies based in New York (state)
2001 establishments in New York City